Ulrich Klaus "Ricky" Wegener (22 August 1929 – 28 December 2017) was a German police officer and founding member of the counter-terrorist force GSG 9.

Early life
Wegener was born in Jüterbog, Brandenburg. He was conscripted into the Luftwaffe as a 15-year-old during the final days of World War II and spent a brief period as a prisoner in a US POW camp at the end of the war. After 1945 Brandenburg, Wegener's home state, fell within the borders of Communist East Germany. In the early 1950s Wegener was arrested for the illegal distribution of dissident pamphlets within East Germany and was imprisoned for one year. In 1952 Wegener moved to West Germany and participated in entrance examinations for the Officer Candidate School of the German Armed Forces.

Career
Colonel Wegener was the Bundesgrenzschutz (Federal Border Protection) liaison officer for German Interior Minister Hans-Dietrich Genscher at the time of the Munich Olympics. Wegener witnessed the botched attempt to rescue the Israeli hostages held by Palestinian terrorists at Munich in 1972 and was subsequently assigned to create an elite counter-terrorist unit by the West German government after the disaster.

GSG 9
Counter-terrorist units were still a relatively unheard-of form of combating terrorism and the only truly established groups at the time were Britain's Special Air Service and Israel's Sayeret Matkal. To this end, Colonel Wegener trained with both groups, assimilating many of their methods into the doctrine he would establish for the GSG 9. Wegener’s time with the SAS is well documented, but his training with the Sayeret (and alleged participation in the rescue of the Israeli hostages in the Operation Entebbe) is less publicized.

Raid on Mogadishu

Wegener was the GSG 9 commander at the liberation of the hostages of the PFLP on the Boeing 737 Landshut, operated by Lufthansa as flight 181, in Mogadishu, Somalia, in the night from 17 to 18 October 1977.  Wegener, at the head of one group, blew open the front door of the aircraft as the German commandos stormed the plane. Two terrorists were killed, one was fatally wounded and the fourth was captured alive. Having both planned and led the successful operation to liberate the hostages of the Lufthansa 181 hijacking Wegener was awarded the German Commander's Cross of the Federal Cross of Merit (Großes Bundesverdienstkreuz).

Later life
After his retirement from GSG 9 in 1979, Wegener worked as an advisor for the creation of counter-terrorism units of foreign countries, e.g. in Saudi Arabia. Wegener was a member of the Security Committee until he retired in 1988.

Married to Magda, he is survived by his daughters Simone and Susanne. Aged 88, Wegener died on 28 December 2017.

Awards
1977, Commander's Cross of the Federal Cross of Merit

1978, Golden Plate Award of the American Academy of Achievement

References

1929 births
2017 deaths
Child soldiers in World War II
Commanders Crosses of the Order of Merit of the Federal Republic of Germany
German police officers
German prisoners of war in World War II held by the United States
GSG 9
Luftwaffe personnel of World War II
People in counterterrorism
People from the Province of Brandenburg
People from Jüterbog